Darevskia rudis is a lizard species in the genus Darevskia. It is found in Georgia, Russia, Azerbaijan, and Turkey.

References

Darevskia
Reptiles described in 1886
Taxa named by Jacques von Bedriaga
Reptiles of Russia